Moshe Rosman (born 1949) is an Israeli historian specializing in the history of Polish Jews. He is a professor emeritus at the Department of Jewish History in Bar-Ilan University.

Awards 
1996: National Jewish Book Award in the Jewish History category for Founder of Hasidism: A Quest for the Historical Ba'al Shem Tov

References

Academic staff of Bar-Ilan University
1949 births
Israeli historians
Historians of Jews and Judaism
Living people